A referendum on building an airfield was held in the Pitcairn Islands in March 1981. With the island only accessible by boat, around 90% voted in favour of constructing an airfield. The Island Council supported the construction of an airfield. However, construction was too expensive for the British Authorities.

Results

References

1981 referendums
1981
1981 in the Pitcairn Islands
March 1981 events in Oceania